Patrick Ovie (born 2 June 1978) is a former Nigerian football defender.

Club career
Born in Lagos, Ovie started his professional career with Shooting Stars of Nigeria, before moving to Israel, where he spent two years. In 2002, Ovie joined Russian Premier League side Krylia Sovetov, where he spent the next three and a half years before joining FC Dynamo Moscow in the summer of 2006, alongside his countryman Joseph Enakarhire. He retired in December 2009 from his professional football career to care his sick wife.

International career
His performances for Krylia Sovetov earned him several caps for Nigeria.

Personal life
He is Kadiri Ikhana's son in law.

References

External links

1978 births
Living people
Association football defenders
Nigerian footballers
Nigeria international footballers
Shooting Stars S.C. players
Hapoel Rishon LeZion F.C. players
PFC Krylia Sovetov Samara players
FC Dynamo Moscow players
FC Astana players
Liga Leumit players
Russian Premier League players
Kazakhstan Premier League players
Expatriate footballers in Israel
Expatriate footballers in Russia
Expatriate footballers in Kazakhstan
Nigerian expatriate sportspeople in Israel
Nigerian expatriate sportspeople in Russia
Nigerian expatriate sportspeople in Kazakhstan